Passage SAS, formerly "ERAM-industrie", is a subsidiary of the Group Eram, specialising in the manufacturing of anti-slip coatings, signage, and interior and exterior urban equipment.

History
Established in 1977, Eram's first business activity was to produce shoe soles from synthetic materials. Beginning in 1978, Eram started to specialize in the production of tennis courts made from resin and polyurethane pellets, thus creating Terre Battue Synthétique (Synthetic Clay) and the "TBS" brand.

In 1979, "TBS" developed applications for its anti-slip coatings  in the world of sailing. Eric Tabarly collaborated in the development of the material which he went on to test on his boat Paul Ricard  when taking part in the Lorient-Bermuda-Lorient transatlantic race. Since 1983, yachtsmen such as Philippe Jeantot, Florence Arthaud and Pierre Follenfant have been equipped with TBS anti-slip products, thus contributing to the promotion of the image of TBS anti-slip in the field of racing. In collaboration with Renault, "TBS anti-slip" equipped assembly areas and work stations. At the same time, the brand developed construction applications, in particular by supplying the nosing for the Paris metro steps and equipping the pedestrian zones in cities such as Lyon, Lille and Bordeaux.

In 1992, TBS developed a new range of products designed for risk prevention and accessibility in the construction and transport sectors.

During the summer of 2009, TBS worked on two sailing projects. They equipped the challenger 67 from the "Voile australe" group, and the expedition boat "Xplore Expeditions" with anti-slip equipment. TBS signed a partnership agreement for these two projects. The first fighting for equality of opportunities and the second for saving ecological heritage.

In June 2010, Eram changed its business name and became Passage SAS.

External links  
http://www.kelmagasin.com/enseignes/tbs.html
http://www.voile-australe.com/en/podorange-bateau.php
https://web.archive.org/web/20111026014938/http://www.xplore-expeditions.com/1-16360-French-Home-Page.php
https://web.archive.org/web/20101025092224/http://www.eram-industrie.fr/

Manufacturing companies of France
Companies based in Pays de la Loire